Deodat del Monte, Deodat van der Mont or Deodatus Delmont (baptized 24 September 1582, in Sint-Truiden – 24 November 1644, in Antwerp) was a Baroque painter, architect, engineer, astronomer, and art dealer who was part of the inner circle of Peter Paul Rubens.

Life
Deodat van der Mont was born on or shortly before 24 September 1582 (the date of his baptism) in Sint-Truiden.  His parents were Ghuilliam van der Mont, a goldsmith, and Margriet Pruynen.  His family was influential locally but was not a part of the aristocracy as has been assumed by some sources.  His father moved to Antwerp in 1590 after he was forced to leave Sint-Truiden in the Prince-Bishopric of Liège due to accusations of money forgery.

Del Monte's life is closely connected to Rubens.  According to contemporary witnesses, del Monte and Rubens were best friends from an early age. Del Monte would also have been his earliest pupil, at least in the area of painting. It is believed that he became a pupil of Rubens between 1598 (the year in which Rubens became a master) and 1600. He possibly studied under another master before becoming Rubens' pupil.

Del Monte travelled with Rubens to Italy in 1600, according to some sources in Rubens' service while others state that they travelled as best friends. The pair were together in Italy most of the time for a period of 8 years. This is evidenced by del Monte's witnessing in 1608 of a contract between Rubens and the Oratorians for the execution of an altarpiece for the San Filippo Neri church in Ferro, Italy.

Immediately upon his return to Antwerp with Rubens in 1608, del Monte was registered as a 'wijnmeester' ('wine master') of the local Guild of St Luke. As this is a title reserved for the sons of members of the Guild, the conclusion can be drawn that his father was or had been a member of the Guild.  Del Monte joined the next year the 'sodaliteit of bejaerde jongmans', a fraternity for bachelors established by the Jesuit order.  He served as the 'consulteur' of the fraternity in December 1609, 1610 and 1614. He worked as a painter and is recorded as having a workshop with two pupils in 1610. His earliest commission was for a triptych for the main altar of the Saint Benedict Church in Mortsel.  This work was completed in 1612 but was later replaced by a work by Anton Goubau and is now lost.

Del Monte married Geertruyt vanden Berghe on 26 October 1614.  The couple had three sons. The early biographer Cornelis de Bie asserts in his Het Gulden Cabinet of 1662 that del Monte was in the service of Wolfgang Wilhelm, Count Palatine of Neuburg for some time. Some historians place this period of service in the 1610s but this is unlikely since during this time there are ample records of del Monte's presence in Antwerp. It is, however, likely that del Monte was in Wolfgang Wilhelm's service since the Count Palatine knighted him in 1626 and allowed him to have a coat-of-arms.

It is further believed that he entered the service of the then governors of the Southern Netherlands, the Archdukes Albert and Isabella.

He also worked as an architect and military engineer for King Philip III of Spain. The King granted him several privileges that were threatened in his later years. Cornelis de Bie alleged that the king's son Philip IV of Spain intervened on Del Monte's behalf with his brother Cardinal-Infante Ferdinand of Austria, who at the time was the governor of the Habsburg Netherlands, and his privileges were restored.

In his later years del Monte's financial situation deteriorated, probably because he was no longer able to work due to illness. He died in 1644, having long predicted from the stars that he would die in his 63rd year.

Del Monte's pupils included Boudewyn Claessen (1610), Thomas Morren (1610), Thomas van Bemelen (1621–22), Jakus Adriaenssen (1622–23), van den Berch (1623–24) and Martin Goes (1625–26).

Work
There is little information about del Monte's painterly oeuvre as only a few signed works have survived.  He worked in de genres of history painting and portrait painting. In 1610 he made an altarpiece for the St Benedict church of Mortsel, which is lost. In 1614 he painted a Transfiguration for the Antwerp Cathedral which is now in the Royal Museum of Fine Arts Antwerp.  There is a signed The Descent from the Cross (1623) in the Onze-Lieve-Vrouw Hemelvaart Church in Munsterbilzen. These works show the classical plasticity that characterise the works that Rubens painted between 1612 and 1618.  

An Adoration of the Magi (Royal Museum of Fine Arts Antwerp) has been attributed to del Monte.  This work is of much higher quality than the signed works of del Monte.  It possibly helps explain why he was so highly regarded in his time and why the early artist biographer Cornelis de Bie dedicated more space to del Monte than to Jacob Jordaens and Anthony van Dyck.

Other attributions to del Monte include a painting on The four elements (sold at Jean Moust) dated 1644, which must then have been painted in the year he was ill and died. The still life in the composition is attributed to Osias Beert the Younger. A Triumph of Bacchus in India was attributed to del Monte when sold in 2000 but to Simon de Vos when sold by the same auction house Dorotheum in 2002.<ref>[https://rkd.nl/explore/images/238554 Attributed to Deodat van der Mont, The Triumph of Bacchus] at the Netherlands Institute for Art History </ref>

A drawing entitled Anointing the Dead Christ'' in the Fogg Museum has been attributed to del Monte.  It is a preparatory drawing for a painting by del Monte in the Onze-Lieve-Vrouw Hemelvaart Church in Munsterbilzen.

It is assumed that del Monte assisted Rubens in his architectural designs.

References

External links

1582 births
1644 deaths
Court painters
Painters from Antwerp
People from Sint-Truiden